Štefan Pekár (born 3 December 1988) is a Slovak footballer who currently plays for Spartak Myjava in 3. liga East as a winger or a second striker.

Club career
He was signed by Spartak Trnava in July 2017.

Honours 
Spartak Trnava
 Slovak Super Liga: 2017–18
 Slovak Cup: 2018–19

References

External links
 
  at mfkruzomberok.sk 

1988 births
Living people
Slovak footballers
Association football forwards
FK Mladá Boleslav players
Expatriate footballers in the Czech Republic
FC Baník Prievidza players
MFK Ružomberok players
Spartak Myjava players
FC Baník Ostrava players
Slovak Super Liga players
Sportspeople from Bojnice